Golf is one of the sports at the quadrennial Mediterranean Games competition. It has been a sport in the program of the Mediterranean Games since 1991.

Medalists

Men

Source:

WomenSource:

All-time medal table
Updated after the 2018 Mediterranean Games

References

 
Cycling
Mediterranean Games